Gerhard Schach (8 March 1906 – 30 April 1945) was a German politician, who was a member of the Preußischer Landtag (in 1933) and the Reichstag (from 1933 to 1945). He was present in the Berlin Führerbunker during the last days of Adolf Hitler in April 1945. Schach left the bunker complex on 1 May 1945.

References

1906 births
Nazi Party politicians
Members of the Reichstag of Nazi Germany
Recipients of the Knights Cross of the War Merit Cross

1945 deaths